José Rodrigues Maio, more commonly known as Cego do Maio CvTE (8 October 1817 – 13 November 1884) was a Portuguese hero, lifeguard and fisherman from Póvoa de Varzim.

He was awarded with the highest honour of the State, the Collar of Knight of the Order of the Tower and Sword and the Gold medal of the Royal Humanitarian Society of Porto, placed personally by King Louis I for the lives that he saved in the sea of Póvoa de Varzim.

People from Póvoa de Varzim
19th-century Portuguese people
1817 births
1884 deaths
Recipients of the Order of the Tower and Sword